The Battle of Cádiz (1640) was a naval battle in the Franco-Spanish War (1635-1659), which took place on July 21, 1640, when a French squadron under Jean Armand de Maillé-Brézé attacked a Spanish convoy coming from the Americas.

The attack occurred just in front of the coast of Cádiz. Armand de Breze employed a hitherto unknown tactic to attack the Spanish convoy from both sides. The Spanish lost a galleon and a small vessel but the convoy completed its journey and delivered most of its cargoes including its silver bullion. French losses are unknown.

Notes

References

Further reading

Conflicts in 1640
Battles involving France
Battles involving Spain
Naval battles of the Franco-Spanish War (1635–1659)
1640 in Europe
History of Cádiz
1640 in Spain